Out of This World, released in 1983 on the Polydor label, is the fourth album by English jazz-funk band Shakatak.

Track listing
All tracks written by William "Bill" Sharpe and Roger Odell.

Side 1:
"Dark Is the Night" – 5:28
"Don't Say That Again" – 4:46
"Slip Away" – 5:19
"On Nights Like Tonight" – 5:13

Side 2:
"Out of This World" – 5:53
"Let's Get Together" – 3:48
"If You Could See Me Now" – 6:56
"Sanur" – 4:45

Personnel
 Bill Sharpe – keyboards 
 Keith Winter – guitars
 George Anderson – bass, backing vocals
 Roger Odell – drums & percussion
 Jill Saward – vocals, lead on "Let's Get Together"
 Norma Lewis – vocals

Guest musicians and vocalists 
 Lead vocal on "Nights Like Tonight" – Tracy Ackerman
 Percussion – Simon Morton
 Trumpet – Stuart Brookes
 Saxophone – Martin Dobson
 Brass arrangement – Nigel Wright

References

External links 
 Shakatak - Out of This World (1983) album credits & releases at AllMusic
 Shakatak - Out of This World (1983) album releases & credits at Discogs
 Shakatak - Out of This World (1983, Remastered 2018 with bonus tracks) album to be listened as stream on Spotify

1983 albums
Shakatak albums
Polydor Records albums
Albums produced by Nigel Wright